Georghios Pikis (born 1939) is a Cypriot judge and a former member of the International Criminal Court.  He was President of the Supreme Court of Cyprus from 1995 to 2004, and he has also served as an ad hoc judge of the European Court of Human Rights and as a member of the United Nations Committee against Torture.

He was elected to the International Criminal Court in 2003 for a six-year term, and he was assigned to the Appeals Division.

See also
Judges of the International Criminal Court

References

1939 births
Living people
Cypriot non-fiction writers
20th-century Cypriot judges
International Criminal Court judges
Legal writers
20th-century Cypriot writers
Cypriot judges of international courts and tribunals
21st-century Cypriot judges